Julie Tracy Malenfant Northrup (June 16, 1973 – January 15, 2020) was a Canadian mixed martial artist and weightlifter. She won a Bronze medal in the 1993 World Weightlifting Championships and participated in the 1997 World Weightlifting Championships, 1999 World Weightlifting Championships and Weightlifting at the 1999 Pan American Games. She was also on Canada’s 2002 Olympic bobsled team.

Mixed martial arts record

|-
| Loss
| align=center| 0–2
| Sara McMann
| Submission (punches)
| BlackEye Promotions 4
| 
| align=center|1
| align=center|0:32
|Fletcher, North Carolina, United States
|
|-
| Loss
| align=center| 0–1
| Valérie Létourneau
| TKO (punches)
| Ringside MMA 10: Cote vs. Starnes
| 
| align=center|2
| align=center|2:15
|Montreal, Quebec, Canada
|
|-
|}

References

1973 births
People from Elliot Lake
Sportspeople from Ontario
2020 deaths
Canadian female mixed martial artists
Bantamweight mixed martial artists
Canadian female weightlifters
Weightlifters at the 1999 Pan American Games
Pan American Games competitors for Canada